"O.N.E." is a song by American experimental rock band Yeasayer. It was released as the second official single from the band's second studio album Odd Blood under Secretly Canadian in the United States and Mute Records in the United Kingdom on March 23, 2010. The song has peaked at number 24 on the Belgian Ultratop Flanders single chart and at number 190 on the UK Singles Chart. It has been included in the in-game soundtracks for Grand Theft Auto V, FIFA 11, and NBA Baller Beats.

Music video
The official music video for the song, lasting four minutes and six seconds, was uploaded to YouTube on March 9, 2010 and was directed by Radical Friend. The video features a shorter edit of the song, lasting three minutes and thirty seconds, compared to the album version which lasts five minutes and twenty-three seconds.

Reception
Pitchfork Media listed "O.N.E." as the 28th best song of 2010, stating that "It's always satisfying when a band gets everything right, and "O.N.E." is the sound of Yeasayer hitting all its marks." NME placed "O.N.E" at number 90 on its list of "150 Best Tracks of the Past 15 Years". On 26 January 2011, "O.N.E." was voted #30 on the Triple J Hottest 100, 2010.

Track listing

12" vinyl
 SC213 / 12MUTE435

Digital download

Charts

Release history

References

2010 singles
2010 songs
Mute Records singles